The 2007 Middle Tennessee Blue Raiders football team represented Middle Tennessee State University as a member of the Sun Belt Conference during the 2007 NCAA Division I FBS football season. Led by second-year head coach Rick Stockstill, the Blue Raiders compiled an overall record of 5–7 with a mark of 4–3 in conference play, tying for third place in the Sun Belt. The team played home games at Johnny "Red" Floyd Stadium in Murfreesboro, Tennessee.

Schedule

Game summaries

Florida Atlantic

Louisville

LSU

WKU

FIU

Virginia

Memphis

Arkansas State

North Texas

Louisiana–Monroe

Louisiana–Lafayette

Troy

References

Middle Tennessee
Middle Tennessee Blue Raiders football seasons
Middle Tennessee Blue Raiders football